The 2000 Northwestern Wildcats football team represented Northwestern University during the 2000 NCAA Division I-A football season. They played their home games at Ryan Field and participated as members of the Big Ten Conference. They were coached by Randy Walker.

Schedule

Personnel

Rankings

Season summary

at Minnesota

References

Northwestern
Northwestern Wildcats football seasons
Northwestern Wildcats football